Huldreslåt is a Scandinavian Folk band that was born not in Scandinavia but in Buenos Aires, Argentina, in the year 2006. The musicians devote themselves to the study of the vast musical legacy of Northern Europe. Their work consists in taking melodies that hail from Scandinavia to perform them at their discretion, based on the musical formation of each member of the project. 
Furthermore, it is notable to mention that they do not leave the musical heritage of the Slav and Baltic countries aside, but include several tunes from these so rich in culture and history regions.

Band members

Martín Fuchinecco - Fiddle, Kantele, Accordion, Säckpipa, Nyckelharpa.
Sergio Ribnikov Gunnarsson - Vocals, Irish Bouzouki, Härjedalspipa, Vevlira.
Johanna Ribnikov Gunnarsson - Vocals, Mungiga, Kulning.

External links
 Official Huldreslåt Website
 Huldreslåt YouTube
 Huldreslåt Fotolog
 Huldreslåt Facebook
 Huldreslåt Twitter
 Huldreslåt Friendfeed
 Huldreslåt Lastfm
 Huldreslåt Feedburner
 Huldreslåt Google Profile
 Huldreslåt Google Reader

Folk rock groups
Argentine folk music groups